Valerio Vermiglio (born 1 March 1976) is an Italian volleyball player, who was a member of the Italian men's national team, that won the silver medal at the 2004 Summer Olympics in Athens, Greece.

Career
He played with Sisley Treviso and won the 2005–06 CEV Champions League and he also was  awarded "Best Setter".

Vermiglio win the 2011–12 CEV Champions League playing with Zenit Kazan,  also winning the Best Setter award.

Clubs
  Sisley Treviso (2002-2007)
  Lube Banca Marche Macerata (2007-2011)
  Zenit Kazan (2011-2013)
  Fakel Novy Urengoy (2013-2014)
  Copra Elior Piacenza (2014-2015)
  Shahrdari Urmia (2015)
  Paykan Tehran (2015-2016)
  UPCN San Juan (2016-)

Sporting achievements

Individuals
 2005–06 CEV Champions League "Best Setter"
 2011–12 CEV Champions League "Best Setter"

Clubs
 2005–06 CEV Champions League -  Champion, with Sisley Treviso
 2011–12 CEV Champions League -  Champion, with Zenit Kazan

State awards
 2000  Knight's Order of Merit of the Italian Republic
 2004  Officer's Order of Merit of the Italian Republic

References

External links
 

1976 births
Living people
Italian men's volleyball players
Olympic volleyball players of Italy
Olympic silver medalists for Italy
Volleyball players at the 2004 Summer Olympics
Volleyball players at the 2008 Summer Olympics
Sportspeople from Messina
Olympic medalists in volleyball
Medalists at the 2004 Summer Olympics
Universiade medalists in volleyball
Universiade bronze medalists for Italy
Medalists at the 1995 Summer Universiade
VC Zenit Kazan players
Volley Lube players